Shoreham Harbour Lifeboat Station is a Royal National Lifeboat Institution (RNLI) station located in the town of Shoreham-by-Sea in the English county of West Sussex. It underwent extensive re-development in 2010 with a new purpose built boathall to accommodate its new  all-weather lifeboat (AWB). It operates two lifeboats, the AWB  and the  Inshore lifeboat .

Over the years, Shoreham Lifeboat Station crew have been involved in many rescues. Eight RNLI medals for gallantry, five silver and three bronze, have been awarded, the last in 1980.

History

1845–1929: Harbour Commission and transfer to RNLI 
In 1845 the Shoreham Harbour Commissioners decided to provide funds to open a lifeboat service for the town.

In 1865 the RNLI took over the lifeboat service for Shoreham, establishing a station with a boathouse on Kingston beach. In 1870 the Harbour Board funded the installation of a slipway. The 1865 boathouse was used until 1892, when a new timber-framed boathouse was built on the western side of the Harbour. The old building was demolished.  

On 16 December 1874 the Ramonet capsized while on a training exercise in rough weather and heavy seas. One crewman drowned. A local customs officer swam out to attempt to assist, and was awarded the RNLI Silver Medal. 

In 1903, the boathouse was moved further from the shore. 

In October 1924, the station was closed, as the silt deposits in the harbour entrance had created a sandbar which made operations impossible. The station did not re-open until October 1929 after work had been carried out to remove the sandbar.

1933–1941: new station and World War II rescues 
In 1933 the station moved to Kingston Beach opposite Shoreham Harbour. The new boathouse and slipway were built to accommodate the new 41 ft   lifeboat. The 1933 boathouse is still standing, but has undergone several alterations to accommodate different lifeboats serving at the station.  

During World War II, Rosa Woodd and Phyllis Lunn took part in the Dunkirk evacuation, crewed by Royal Navy men rather than the lifeboat crew. She was towed to Dunkirk on 1 June 1940 by naval drifter Kindred Star. During the evacuation she made three trips from the beaches back to Dover. 

On 16 November 1941 the Royal Navy minesweeper President Briand was had engine trouble along the coast off Shoreham. Strong wind along with heavy seas were threatening to push the vessel onto the shore. Rosa Woodd and Phyllis Lunn was launched to assist and stood by the ship until 9:30 pm, at which time the tug SS Goole arrived and released the lifeboat. The coxswain of the Rosa Woodd and Phyllis Lunn returned to the President Briand aboard the Shoreham Pilot Cutter to pilot the minesweeper. At 9:45 pm the lifeboat was recalled to service as both the tug and the minesweeper were being driven ashore by the high winds. The tow line broke and the minesweeper rolled heavily, waves breaking over her decks. Avoiding the presence of the naval mines in the vicinity, the lifeboat went alongside multiple times and removed all 22 men aboard the minesweeper, including their own coxswain. Two lifeboat crewmen received RNLI medals for their participation in the rescue. 

Beginning early on 8 August 1948 a strong gale was blowing with rough seas and a heavy swell, shredding the sails of the yacht Gull and driving her out of control off the coast at Shoreham. Rosa Woodd and Phyllis Lunn was launched to assist, hoisting her sail to give her engines enough speed to catch the yacht. The lifeboat eventually caught the yacht at the entrance to Newhaven Harbour, where she had become waterlogged and caught in shallow water. The lifeboat got alongside her and rescued all six people aboard. For this service the coxswain received an RNLI silver medal.

1963–1990: refurbishment and Tyne-class lifeboat 
In 1967 the station was supplied with a second lifeboat. This was a  inshore lifeboat and was kept in its own berth constructed beneath the main boathouse.

From 16 to 19 October 1971, the drilling rig William Allpress was anchored three-quarters of a mile off the coast near Rustington awaiting a tow in deteriorating weather. The rig's five crewmen crew were unable to eat or sleep in the rough weather, and needed rescue. The Dorothy and Philip Constant was launched at 2:10 pm; the seas were rough and torrential rain made visibility extremely limited. The life-boat crew were able to pull the rig's crew on board across the foredeck to safety. The coxswain was awarded an RNLI Bronze medal for his part.

On 5 August 1975, the yacht Albin Ballard was drifting with wrecked sails owing to heavy seas and gale-force winds. At 3:15 am the Dorothy and Philip Constant was launched and found the yacht due south of Littlehampton, deluged with large waves, and with a seasick, exhausted crew. Two of the lifeboat's crewmen boarded the yacht and set up a towline, safely bringing her into Shoreham at 7.25 am. The coxswain was awarded an RNLI Bronze medal for his part.
On 20 January 1980, the MS Athina B arrived at Shoreham-by-Sea from the Azores archipelago. During the voyage, she had problems with her generator, gyro compass and radar, and put in at La Rochelle in France for repairs. On arrival at Shoreham, the vessel was caught in gale force seven or eight winds, and with seas breaking across her decks, she was unable to enter. Her engines failed, and a Mayday call was issued. The Dorothy and Philip Constance was launched to service at 8:40, and rescued half the crew as well as the captain's family. The lifeboat returned the next day to rescue the remaining crew. The coxswain was awarded an RNLI Silver Medal. 

In 1981, sinkage of the slipway led to the allocation of a 13-ton  lifeboat, primarily designed for carriage launching. The slipway was strengthened following the decision to place a  boat on station. The Rother was replaced in 1986 by the first of two  boats that served for four years before being replaced by the new Tyne. 

In 1990 the new  lifeboat  arrived at Shoreham. She was on station until 2010, following which the station was served by various relief fleet Tynes until the new  entered service in December 2010.

2008: redevelopment and Tamar-class lifeboat 
In 2008, a £1 million public appeal was launched to partially fund another rebuild, this time to accommodate a new  lifeboat. In January 2009 the old station boathouse and slipway were demolished and the station was temporarily housed on Kingston Beach. The building is timber-framed on three storeys, has boat halls for the all-weather and inshore lifeboats, and dedicated slipways to the harbour. The previous boathouse and station encountered occasional problems with flooding due to high spring tides and waves. The rebuilt station included a wave pit at the front of the station, which breaks the waves before they hit the boathouse door, preventing these floods.

The project cost a total of £4.2 million and was officially opened by the Prince Edward, Duke of Kent on 16 June 2011. The £2.7 million Tamar-class   arrived at the station on 10 December 2010. She was funded by bequests, gifts, legacies. 

The station also maintains a D-class inshore lifeboat, the Joan Woodland (D-784), which was placed in service in 2015.

Fleet

All Weather lifeboats

Inshore lifeboats

Gallery

Neighbouring Station Locations

References

External links
 Official station website 
 RNLI station information

Lifeboat stations in West Sussex
Shoreham-by-Sea